Bolshiye Ostrova is a rural locality (a village) in Bereznikovskoye Rural Settlement, Sobinsky District, Vladimir Oblast, Russia. The population was 16 as of 2010.

Geography 
Bolshiye Ostrova is located 34 km southeast of Sobinka (the district's administrative centre) by road. Malye Ostrova is the nearest rural locality.

References 

Rural localities in Sobinsky District